Tikendra Patel (born 9 October 1965) is an Indian former first-class cricketer.

Patel was born at Ahmedabad, later attending Queen's College at the University of Oxford in England. While studying at Oxford, he made his debut in first-class cricket for Oxford University against Somerset at Oxford in 1985. He played first-class cricket for Oxford until the end of the 1986 season, making a total of fifteen appearances. He scored a total of 222 runs in his fifteen matches, at an average of 10.57 and a high score of 47. In addition to playing first-class cricket, Patel also played minor counties cricket for Bedfordshire from 1983–85, making four appearances in the Minor Counties Championship.

References

External links

1965 births
Living people
People from Ahmedabad
Alumni of The Queen's College, Oxford
Indian cricketers
Bedfordshire cricketers
Oxford University cricketers